Patrice Bret may refer to:
 Patrice Bret (ski mountaineer) (born 1971), French ski mountaineer
 Patrice Bret (historian) (born 1949), French historian of science and technology